Czołpino Lighthouse (Polish: Latarnia Morska Czołpino) is a lighthouse located on the Polish coast of the Baltic Sea, located to the north of the village of Czołpino, Pomeranian Voivodeship.

The lighthouse is located between Ustka's and Stilo's lighthouses.

History 
The lighthouse's construction was completed on 15 January 1875. On top of the tower, there is an optical device made in France, from 1926. The lighthouse has a drum lens, made from forty-three prismatic crystals.

See also 

 List of lighthouses in Poland

References

External links 

 Urząd Morski w Słupsku 

Lighthouses completed in 1875
Resort architecture in Pomerania
Lighthouses in Poland
Tourist attractions in Pomeranian Voivodeship